Thénioux is a commune in the Cher department in the Centre-Val de Loire region of France.

Geography
The now disused Canal de Berry passes through the middle of the commune, which is also served by the TER railway.

Population

Sights
 The church, dating from the fifteenth century.
 The World War II memorial.

See also
Communes of the Cher department

References

Communes of Cher (department)